Óscar Fraustro (born 14 June 1982) is a Mexican professional golfer. He turned professional in 2006 and has played on the PGA Tour, Web.com Tour, and PGA Tour Latinoamérica. He finished 43rd in the 2014 Web.com Tour Finals to earn his PGA Tour card for the 2014–15 season.

Professional wins (2)

PGA Tour Latinoamérica wins (2)

Team appearances
Amateur
Eisenhower Trophy (representing Mexico): 2004

Professional
World Cup (representing Mexico): 2013
Aruba Cup (representing PGA Tour Latinoamérica): 2017

See also
2014 Web.com Tour Finals graduates

References

External links

Mexican male golfers
PGA Tour golfers
PGA Tour Latinoamérica golfers
Korn Ferry Tour graduates
Sportspeople from Mexico City
1982 births
Living people
21st-century Mexican people